The Bishop's Chapel (Spanish: Capilla del Obispo de Madrid) is a chapel, located in Madrid, Spain, which was built in the 16th century. It is named after Gutierre de Vargas Carvajal, Bishop of Plasencia, who is buried there.

The chapel is adjacent to the Church of San Andrés and was intended to hold the remains of
San Isidro, patron saint of Madrid, who was initially buried at this site. 
When the saint's body was discovered in the late 13th century, two centuries after his death, King Alfonso XI ordered the construction in San Andres of an ark to hold his remains and a chapel in which to venerate his memory.  In the 18th century, San Isidro's remains were relocated to the Basílica de Nuestra Señora del Buen Consejo.

Conservation
It was given a heritage listing in 1931 and is protected as a Bien de Interés Cultural.

References 

Roman Catholic chapels in Madrid
Bien de Interés Cultural landmarks in Madrid
Buildings and structures in Palacio neighborhood, Madrid